Apne is a 2007 Indian Hindi-language sports drama film directed by Anil Sharma. It is the first film to feature Dharmendra and his real-life sons Sunny Deol and Bobby Deol together. Previously Sunny and Bobby had worked together in Dillagi (1999) and Dharmendra and Sunny had also appeared together in Sultanat (1986) and Kshatriya (1993). Katrina Kaif, Shilpa Shetty and Kiron Kher play the female leads. The film opened to an excellent response across India and emerged as a hit overseas as well.

Dharmendra plays the role of a disgraced ex-boxer Baldev Chaudhary who tries to wash a stain in his boxing career through his sons Angad and Karan (Sunny & Bobby Deol). Dharmendra had earlier played the role of a boxer in the film Main Intequam Loonga (1982). Footage from that film is used as flashback scenes in this film to show Baldev's career as a boxer.

Plot

Former Olympic medallist boxer Baldev Choudhary is disgraced while competing for the World Heavy weight championship when a betting syndicate falsely accuses him of drug doping. He tries to erase this stain upon his honour by training up his son, Angad, but financial difficulties keep them from achieving his dream. He trains a local boy to get into a media hyped TV boxing show, but is dropped for a better coach at the last minute. Baldev's younger son Karan has just launched his first music album. Realising his father is depressed, he gives up his own dream of a musical career to become a boxer and please his father. Karan persists with training and wins a series of fights, thinking that victory will bring his family together. The final match is with the current world heavy weight champion; Karan is tricked, and he ends up paralysed in a hospital bed. Baldev, who wanted to wash a stigma, is now about to lose his son. When Karan reveals the world heavy weight champion cheated, Angad decides to return to boxing and win the title for his father. Although Angad is also badly injured in boxing match but somehow survives and wins the match. meanwhile, Karan suffers liver damage and requires a liver to survive. A pang of guilt stricken Baldev pleads with the doctors to use his liver, but the doctors reject the idea. In a stroke of luck, a liver is given to Karan through an unknown donor. In the end, Baldev, who was going to give up his life for Karan, is instead alive and happy with his family.

Cast
 Dharmendra as Baldev Singh Choudhary
 Sunny Deol as Angad Singh Choudhary
 Bobby Deol as Karan Singh Choudhary
 Katrina Kaif as Nandini Sarabhai
 Shilpa Shetty as Simran Choudhary
 Kirron Kher as Raavi Choudhary
 Javed Sheikh as Nikunj Jonas (Baldev's friend and media baron)
 Victor Banerjee as Ehsaan Ali (Baldev's friend)
 Jonnie Brown as Luca Gracia
 Divya Dutta as Pooja
 Raj Khatri as Boxing Commentator
 Aryan Vaid as Gaurav Gera
 Kurush Deboo as Dr. Niranjan Sarabhai
 Marvina Vinique as Luca's wife
 Jonathan Samson as a Bodyguard
 Rajendra Gupta as Bhullar Saab
 Bhagwant Mann as himself
 Amar Singh as himself

Soundtrack

The Soundtrack of the movie was composed by Himesh Reshammiya. Apne was the last film in which Reshammiya and Sonu Nigam worked together due to the issues between them both.

 "Mehfooz Rakhta Hoon" – Himesh Reshammiya
 "Dekhoon Tujhe" – Himesh Reshammiya, Akriti Kakkar
 "Apne To Apne Hote Hain" – Jaspinder Narula, Sonu Nigam, Jayesh Gandhi
 "Ankh Vich Chehra Pyaar Da" – Shaan, Kunal Ganjawala, Amrita Kak, Himesh Reshammiya (replaced in the movie by Zubeen Garg)
 "Bulls Eye" – Shaan, Earl D'Souza
 "Tere Sang" – Jaspinder Narula, Sonu Nigam
 "Mehfooz" (Remix) – Himesh Reshammiya
 "Ankh Vich Chehra Pyaar Da" (Remix) – Shaan, Amrita Kak, Himesh Reshammiya, Kunal Ganjawala
 "Dekhoon Tujhe To Pyaar Aaye" (Remix) – Himesh Reshammiya, Akriti Kakkar

Reception

Box office 
Apne opened to a very good response throughout the country especially in the Northern territories most notably Punjab where it had a mammoth opening becoming a gigantic blockbuster in the long run. The rest of the country saw a good opening for Apne. The Gross Collection of Apne was ₹45 crore.

The film has been declared a semi-hit overseas and a hit in India.

Reviews 
Taran Adarsh in his review stated that "Apne is rich in emotions and has the potential to strike a chord with families. Those who love emotional fares are bound to take a liking for its theme." The movie was also dubbed into Punjabi.

Sequel 
A sequel named Apne 2 was officially announced on 30 November 2020, and will star Dharmendra, Sunny Deol, Bobby Deol and Sunny's son Karan Deol. It goes on floors in March 2021 and has been scheduled for a theatrical release on 5 November 2021, coinciding with Diwali. Delayed due to the COVID-19 pandemic.

See also
 Main Intequam Loonga (1982)
 Boxer (1984)

References

External links
 

2007 films
2000s Hindi-language films
Indian boxing films
Indian sports drama films
2000s sports drama films
Films scored by Himesh Reshammiya
Films directed by Anil Sharma
2007 drama films
Films shot in Gujarat